Raúl Muñoz (28 April 1919 – 3 October 1959) was a Chilean footballer. He played in four matches for the Chile national football team in 1939. He was also part of Chile's squad for the 1939 South American Championship.

References

External links
 

1919 births
1959 deaths
Chilean footballers
Chile international footballers
Place of birth missing
Association football forwards
Magallanes footballers